Hardcore '81 is an album by the Canadian hardcore punk band D.O.A. It is considered by some to be the first time that a certain style of punk rock was labeled hardcore.

In 2019, the album was named as the public vote winner of the Polaris Heritage Prize.

Track listing

Some CD re-issues of Hardcore '81 include four bonus tracks from the EP Don't Turn Yer Back (On Desperate Times)

Personnel
Joey "Shithead" Keithley - lead guitar, lead vocals
Dave Gregg - rhythm guitar, backing vocals
Randy Rampage - bass, backing vocals
Chuck Biscuits - drums
Tracy Marks - acoustic piano on "Unknown" also engineered the album

References

Sudden Death Records albums
1981 albums
D.O.A. (band) albums